Cerbere can refer to

 Cerbère, a small town in Southern France on the border with Spain
 Naberius, a demon with several alternative spellings, including Cerberus, Cerbere